Simple Song may refer to:

 "Simple Song" (The Shins song), 2012 
 "Simple Song", a song by Avail rom the 1996 album 4am Friday
 "Simple Song", a song by Lyle Lovett from the 1987 album Pontiac
 "Simple Song", a song by Miley Cyrus from the 2008 album Breakout
 "Simple Song", a song by Passenger from the 2017 album The Boy Who Cried Wolf
 "Simple Song#3", a song by Sumi Jo from the 2015 film Youth

See also

Simple (disambiguation)#Songs